B, S & T; 4 (also expanded as Blood, Sweat & Tears; 4) is the fourth album by the band Blood, Sweat & Tears, released in June 1971. It peaked at number 10 on the Billboard Pop albums chart.

The band invited former member Al Kooper to contribute the song "John the Baptist (Holy John)."  Trombonist Dave Bargeron replaced Jerry Hyman.

David Clayton-Thomas left as lead vocalist to pursue a solo career after the release of B, S & T; 4, as did founding members Dick Halligan and Fred Lipsius. Clayton-Thomas would return to the lineup for 1975's New City.

Reception

Writing for Allmusic, critic William Ruhlman wrote "the band's cohesion seemed to be disintegrating. Although the album scraped the Top Ten briefly and went gold, it marked the end of BS&T's period of wide commercial success on records."

Track listing
"Go Down Gamblin'" (David Clayton-Thomas) – 4:14
"Cowboys and Indians" (Dick Halligan, Terry Kirkman) – 3:07
"John the Baptist (Holy John)" (Al Kooper, Phyllis Major) – 3:35
"Redemption" (Halligan, Clayton-Thomas) – 5:11
"Lisa, Listen to Me" (Halligan, Clayton-Thomas) – 2:58
"A Look to My Heart" (Fred Lipsius) – 0:52
"High on a Mountain" (Steve Katz) – 3:13
"Valentine's Day" (Katz) – 3:56
"Take Me in Your Arms (Rock Me a Little While)" (Holland-Dozier-Holland) – 3:27
"For My Lady" (Katz) – 3:23
"Mama Gets High" (Dave Bargeron, Katz) – 4:09
"A Look to My Heart" (Lipsius) – 2:07

Personnel
David Clayton-Thomas - lead vocals except as noted; guitar on "Go Down Gamblin'"
Steve Katz - electric guitar, acoustic guitar, harmonica, mandolin; lead vocals on "Valentine's Day"
Jim Fielder - bass; guitar on "Redemption"
Dick Halligan - organ, piano, flute, trombone
Fred Lipsius - alto saxophone, piano, organ, clarinet
Dave Bargeron - trombone, tuba, bass trombone, baritone horn, acoustic bass
Lew Soloff - trumpet, flugelhorn, piccolo trumpet
Chuck Winfield - trumpet, flugelhorn
Bobby Colomby - drums, percussion

Additional musicians
Don Heckman - clarinet, bass clarinet ("Valentine's Day" and "For My Lady")
Michael Smith - congas ("Redemption")

Production
Producers: Don Heckman, Bobby Colomby, Roy Halee
Engineers: Roy Halee, Lou Waxman
Arrangers: Dave Bargeron, David Clayton-Thomas, Jim Fielder, Dick Halligan, Al Kooper, Fred Lipsius
Design and Photography: Norman Seeff

Charts
Album - Billboard (United States)

Singles - Billboard (United States)

References

Blood, Sweat & Tears albums
1971 albums
Albums produced by Roy Halee
Columbia Records albums
Albums produced by Bobby Colomby